This is a list of films produced by Sindhi cinema in Pakistan.

A
 Abana (1958)
 Umar Marvi (1956)
 Ghoonghat Lah Kunwar (1970)
 Ach Ta Bhakar Payun (1976)
 Albeli (1973)
 Ali Gohar (1988)
 Allah Bachaeo (1992)
 Amar Uderolal (1988)
 Anya Ta maan Nadhri aahiyan
 Ammy Ain Mummy
 Aashiqi

B
 Baadal (1972)
 Baadal Aain Barsat (1975)
 Barsat Ji Raat (1985) 
 Bevis (1989)
 Bhagat Kanwar Ram (1951)

C
 Chanduki (1969)
 Chanduki II: Deepak's revenge(1971)
 CHUD 2 (1988)

D
 Darya Khan (1991)
 Dharti Aain Akash (1979)
 Dharti Dilanwarn Ji (1975)
 Dharti La Kanwar (1975)
 Dharti Manji Maa (1996)
 Dil Dije Dil waran khe (2001)
 Ditho Waindo (1994)
 Dosten Jo Piar (1979)
 Dushman (1988)

E 
 Ekta (1942)

F
 Faisala Zamir Jo (1989)
 Faatho Aah Bhagwaan  (2013)

G
 Ghairat Jo Sawal (1974)
 Ghato Ghar Na Aya (1981)
 Ghoonghat Lai Ku'nwaar (1970)

H
 Haidar Khan (1985)
 Hal ta Bhaji Haloon (1987)
 Halo Shaadiya Te (2004)
 Hakim Khan (1986)
 Hazir Saeen (1979)
 Himmat (1997)
 Ho Jamalo (1986)
 Halyo Aa Putt Actor Thiyan (2012)
 Haseen Zindagi (2015) Actors  -Anil vanjani, Kalpana Bhagtani

I
 Invisible Line (2017)
 Insaaf Kithe Ahe? (1959)
 Ishiqu Aazar? (2010)

J
 Jalal Chandio (1985)
 Jai Jhulelal (1989)
 Janu Dharial (1985)
 Jeejal Maa (1973)
 Jhoomar ain Bandooq (1989)
 Jhulelal (1966)
 Jiye Lateef (1990)
 Jeevan Chakra (2010)
 Jeevan Saathi (2011)

K
 Kalu Machhi (1990)
 Ker Kahinjo (1994)
 Karonjhar Te Kook (2014)
 Kayo time pass (2011)

L
 Laila Majnu (1971)
 Ladli

M
 Manju Pyar Pukare (1974)
 Meeran Jamali (1990)
 Mehboob Mitha (1971)
 Mehran Ja Moti (1988)
 Mithra Shal Millan (1972)
 Mofo Millions! (1998)
 Morak (1989) 
 Mr. Shikarpuri (1993)
 Mr. Shakura (1991)
 Muhib Sheedi (1992)
 Mulakhro (1993) 
 Mumta (1984)

N
 Nadir Gohar (1988)
 Nakuli Shaan (1971)
 Nuri Jam Tamachi (1970)

O
 Okha Pand Pyaar Ja

P
 PKsindhi (2016)
 Paarewari (2002)
 Parai Zameen (1958)
 Phulji Station (2010)
 Perdesi (1958)
 Perdesi Aain Piar (1984)
 Phul Machhi (1984)
 Pland (1989)
 Poti Aeen Pag (1986)
 Pro (1987)
 Pukar (1989)
 Puke Party (1962)
 Punnu Aaqil (1970)
 Pyar Kare Dis (2007)
 Pyar Keyo Singhar (1974)
 Pyar Taan Sadqe (1974)
 Pyar Kare Dis (2007)
 Pahenjo Mikdo hi Yaar aa (2016)
 Pyar Jaa Rang (2013) Actors - Anil Vanjani, Poonam Lalwani, Tarana Bhatia .

Q
 Qurbani (1986)

R
 Rang Mahal (1970)
 Rutt Ain Ajrak (1977)
 Rutt Ji Rand (1976)
 Rutt Ja Rishta (1975)
 Raat Hik Toofan Ji (1969)
 Riyasat (2007)

S
 Son of Sindhi (2016)
 Shikarpur Ja Natak (2020) Documentary Film
 Sajawal (1996)
 Sassi Punnu (1958)
 Sant Kanwarram (1990)
 Shaeed (1989)
 Shal Dheear na jaman (1970)
 Sherah Feroz (1968)
 Sindh ja Sapot
 Sindhri Taa Sadqe (1975)
 Soda Putt Sindh Ja (1973)
 Sohna Saeen (1986)
 Soorath (1973)
 Shal Dhier Na Jaman
 Sant Kanwar Ram
 Sindhu Kinaray
 Sard Hawaoon (2014)
 Sindhyani (2017)
 Sasu Ser Nuhn Sawa Ser (2019)

T
 Tee Qaidi (1989)

U
 Umeed (1983)
 Umar Marvi (1956) "The first ever Sindhi feature film released in Pakistan".

V
 Vardaan (2016)

W
 Wadera Sain (1992)

Z
 Zindagi Hik Natak (2009)

See also
 Sindhi cinema
 List of Pakistani films

References

External links
 Search Sindhi Films - IMDB.com



Sindhi
 Pakistan
Lists of Pakistani films